The RV  Derinsu is a Turkish research and survey vessel owned and operated in deep waters by Derinsu Underwater Engineering headquartered in Ankara, Turkey.

The company operates another research vessel .

Vessel
She has a tonnage of

Research capabilities
Originally a fishing boat, she was refit with state-of-the-art instruments and equipment for hydrographic, geophysical, geotechnical, oceanographic and marine environmental surveys.

Service
In 2014, she was commissioned to carry out surveys in the Black Sea off Akliman, Sinop, where the construction of the Sinop Nuclear Power Plant is planned.

See also
List of research vessels of Turkey

References

Research vessels of Turkey
Survey ships
2006 ships